David Turba (born 1982) is a German voice actor. He is the son of voice actor Frank Turba and the brother of voice actor Magdalena Turba. He is best known as the voice of Jun Manjōme in the German dub of Yu-Gi-Oh! GX.

Roles

Television animation
Avatar: The Last Airbender (Sokka (Jack DeSena))
Cardcaptor Sakura (Syaoran Li (Motoko Kumai))
Ed, Edd 'n Eddy (Edd) (Samuel Vincent)
Fullmetal Alchemist (Edward Elric (Romi Park))
Mobile Suit Gundam SEED (Arnold Neumann (Isshin Chiba))
My Life as a Teenage Robot (Brad Carbunkle (Chad Doreck))
Peacemaker Kurogane (Okita Sōji (Mitsuki Saiga))
Recess (Michael "Mikey" Blumberg (Jason Davis))
Watership Down (Fiver)
W.I.T.C.H. (Matt Olsen (Jason Marsden))
Wolf's Rain (Toboe (Hiroki Shimowada))
X (Nataku (Motoko Kumai))
Yu-Gi-Oh! Duel Monsters (Leonhart von Schroider (Seiko Noguchi))
Yu-Gi-Oh! GX (Jun Manjōme (Taiki Matsuno))

Live action
Disturbia (Kale (Shia LaBeouf))
Entourage (Vincent Chase (Adrian Grenier))
Everwood (Ephram Brown (Gregory Smith))
Hairspray (Link Larkin (Zac Efron))
The Hills Have Eyes (Bobby Carter (Dan Byrd))
Jack Frost (Rory Buck (Taylor Handley))
Lonely Hearts (Eddie Robinson (Dan Byrd))
Nip/Tuck (Matt McNamara (John Hensley))
Prison Break (David "Tweener" Apolskis  (Lane Garrison))
Queer as Folk (Justin Taylor (Randy Harrison))
Terminator 3: Rise of the Machines (Bill Anderson (Brian Sites))
The Texas Chainsaw Massacre: The Beginning (Dean (Taylor Handley))
Transformers (Sam Witwicky (Shia LaBeouf))
Veronica Mars (Wallace Fennel (Percy Daggs III))

References

External links

David Turba at the German Dubbing Card Index

1982 births
German male voice actors
Living people